Armstrong Telephone Company is a telecommunications provider, and part of the Armstrong Group of Companies. The company primarily operates as a local exchange carrier in rural markets in West Virginia, Maryland, Pennsylvania, New York and Ohio.

The following Armstrong companies are registered with the FCC :
Armstrong Digital Services, Inc., Armstrong Telephone Company - New York, Armstrong Telephone Company - Pennsylvania, Armstrong Telephone Co. - North, Armstrong Telephone Company - Maryland, Armstrong Telecommunications, Inc., Armstrong Telephone Company - Northern Division, and Armstrong Telephone Company - West Virginia.

References

External links
 Armstrong Group of Companies

Telecommunications companies of the United States
Companies based in Butler County, Pennsylvania
Privately held companies based in Pennsylvania
Telecommunications companies established in 1946
American companies established in 1946
1946 establishments in Pennsylvania
Economy of the Northeastern United States